Stade Lausanne Rugby Club is an amateur Swiss rugby union club from Lausanne, the Olympic Capital. The club plays in the Swiss first division - LNA - and are former Swiss Cup champions.

Club history
Having been one of the eight original clubs to play in the inaugural Swiss Championship when the Switzerland Rugby Union was formed in 1969, Stade Lausanne has been one of the most successful clubs in the country. With six National League A (NLA) and six Swiss Cup titles including 2009 and 2010 Stade Lausanne sits third - behind Hermance RRC and Rugby Club CERN on the National overall club honors list and is the most successful club in Lausanne and canton Vaud.
In the 2010/2011 season the First team marched into the Swiss final against RC Avusy and finished 2nd in the first division and the Second team got promoted to the second division of the Swiss Rugby Union.

Club honours

Licensed Players

See also
Rugby union in Switzerland
Swiss Rugby Federation

References

Rugby clubs established in 1969
1969 establishments in Switzerland
Sport in Lausanne